Hofstra University Museum is the art museum of Hofstra University, located in Hempstead, New York, in Long Island.

The museum has two galleries on campus: the Emily Lowe Gallery and the David Filderman Gallery. The museum and the Emily Lowe Gallery were established in 1963, and have been an active presence in the university for more than 50 years. The David Filderman Gallery was added to the museum in 1991. The Hofstra University Museum is accredited by the American Alliance of Museums (AAM).

The Hofstra University Museum holds a collection of more than 5,000 art and ethnographic objects dating from 1,500 BCE to the contemporary period and representing six continents. The collections have grown primarily through gifts since the founding of Hofstra University in 1935, prior to the establishment of the museum, and there have been many local contributors to the museum's collections. The museum is noteworthy for African art and objects; Asian art is another area of strength with works dating from the seventh to the twentieth century.

The Hofstra University Museum owns an early Gauguin oil painting, Portrait of a Woman (1881–82), works by George Grosz, Conrad Felixmüller, Johan Barthold Jongkind, John Thomas Peele, Georges Rouault, Joseph Stella, Jane Peterson, and Alfred Maurer. Photographs in the collection include works of Berenice Abbott, Lucien Clergue, Danny Lyon, August Sander, Andy Warhol, and Edward Weston.

References

External links
 Hofstra University Museum

Hofstra University
Museums in Nassau County, New York
Art museums and galleries in New York (state)
University art museums and galleries in New York (state)
1963 establishments in New York (state)
Museums established in 1963